An Officer and a Gentleman, The Musical is a stage musical based on the 1982 film of the same name, written by Douglas Day Stewart. It had its world premiere May 18, 2012 at the Lyric Theatre in Sydney, Australia. The musical closed six weeks later on July 1.

It was co-produced by John Frost and Sharleen Cooper Cohen.  The book was written by Douglas Day Stewart and Sharleen Cooper Cohen and the score was written by Ken Hirsch and Robin Lerner.  It was directed by Simon Phillips.  It starred Ben Mingay as Zack Mayo and Amanda Harrison as Paula Pokrifki.

A new version of the musical made its premiere at Curve in Leicester, England in April 2018 before touring the UK. It was directed by Nikolai Foster and used songs from the film's soundtrack such as "Up Where We Belong", "Girls Just Want to Have Fun", "Toy Soldiers", "Alone", "Don't Cry Out Loud" and "Material Girl", opposed to the musical's original score by Hirsch and Lerner.

Reception
The Sydney production received mixed reviews.  In response to a highly negative review in The Australian, calling the show a "bloodless facsimile" of the film, author Stewart published a rebuttal defending the production and attacking the critics for their "eclectic, overly intellectual point of view".  When the show's closing was announced, producer John Frost told a reporter that an American tour was still a possibility, after revisions were made to the show.

The show was nominated for five Helpmann Awards including "Best Musical 2012".  Bert LaBonte won for "Best Supporting Actor".

Cast and characters

*  The character Taniya Seegar was changed to Casey Seegar in the US Touring production.

*  The character Byron Mayo was changed to Zack's Dad in the US Touring production.

Recordings
A promotional disc of five songs was released including  "Up Where We Belong", performed by Ben Mingay, Amanda Harrison, Kate Kendall and Alex Rathgeber, and "If You Believe In Love", sung by Amanda Harrison.

Awards and nominations

References 

2012 musicals
Musicals based on films